Surviliškis Eldership is a Lithuanian eldership, located in the northern part of Kėdainiai District Municipality.  

Eldership was created from the Surviliškis selsovet in 1993.

Geography
All the territory is in the Central Lithuanian Plain (Nevėžis Plain).  
 Rivers: Nevėžis, Liaudė, Kruostas, Skaudinis, Kruostas II;
 Lakes and ponds:  
 Forests: Sosiai forest;
 Protected areas: Krekenava Regional Park, Kruostas botanical sanctuary.

Places of interest
Wooden Catholic church in Surviliškis
Hillforts of Bakainiai, Lomeikiškiai and Vaidatoniai
Manors in Kalnaberžė and Sirutiškis
Old Believers cemetery in Mociūnai
Wayside St. Mary chapel near Surviliškis
Wooden chapel in Surviliškis cemetery
Wooden crosses of famous folk cross maker Vincas Svirskis in Pakruostė and Surviliškis cemetery

Populated places 
Following settlements are located in the Surviliškis Eldership (as for 2011 census):

Towns: Surviliškis
Villages: Bakainiai · Bališkiai · Berželė · Čireliai · Daškoniai · Dembnė · Gojus · Jogniškiai · Kalnaberžė · Kaukalniai · Kutiškiai · Lažai · Lomeikiškiai · Mociūnai · Močėnai · Pakruostė · Pakruostėlė · Sirutiškis · Spigučiai · Sūriškiai · Surviliškis · Urbeliai · Užupė · Vaidatoniai · Vitėnai · Žirnenka

References

Elderships in Kėdainiai District Municipality